Old Forge, Pennsylvania may refer to:

 Old Forge, Franklin County, Pennsylvania
 Old Forge, Lackawanna County, Pennsylvania